Celaenorrhinus ambra is a species of butterfly in the family Hesperiidae. It is found in northern Madagascar. The habitat consists of forests.

References

Butterflies described in 1937
ambra